Beardwood is a village suburb of Blackburn in Lancashire, England. It is relatively close to the village of Mellor and has a local high school. It lies on the western edge of Blackburn, a few miles away from Blackburn town centre. 

In 2013, the Tauheedul Islam Girls' High School moved to Beardwood.

References

External links

Villages in Lancashire
Geography of Blackburn with Darwen